Shin Jee-won (Hangul: 신지원; born April 14, 1996),  better known by her stage name Johyun (조현), is a South Korean singer, rapper, actress and television personality. She was a member of girl group Berry Good from 2016 to their disbandment in 2021.

Early life and education 
Johyun was born as Shin Jee-won in Seongnam, South Korea, on April 14, 1996, from a former ballerina. She was active as a short track skater from elementary school to the first year of junior high school before suffering an injury that made her quit, and going to study abroad. In 2006, she came first place with a record of 49.51 seconds in the 500m race for female elementary 3rd-4th graders at the 9th National Men's and Women's Short Track and Speed Skating Competition. She became an idol trainee in 2013.

She studied Broadcast and Entertainment at Dongduk Women's University.

Career 
Johyun was introduced as the sixth member of Berry Good in late October 2016. She made her official debut on November 1, with the release of their second mini album Glory. Her stage name is a homage to actress Joey Wong, who's known as Wang Jo-hyun in Korean.

In autumn 2017, she joined the cast of talk show We're Also National Athletes, talking about her experience as a short track skater ahead of the Pyeongchang Winter Olympics. She also competed in the reality survival show Mixnine, finishing 24th and being eliminated.

In 2018, she co-hosted the MBC game show Begin A Game. The following year, she made a name for herself in the esports world thanks to her passion for League of Legends, ultimately joining two related shows: Game Dolympics 2019: Golden Card and Egame of Thrones. She competed in the latter one with the Jangtan Gamedan team, reaching the finals.

In 2020, she co-hosted the cable variety show Things These Days alongside Kim Yu-bin and Jun Hyo-seong, had a supporting role in the noir movie The Dragon Inn and was in the main cast of Strange School Tales: The Child Who Wouldn't Come, a horror miniseries. In 2021, she scored her first leading role in the horror thriller movie Hypnosis, and hosted the second season of Things These Days alongside Heo Young-ji.

On May 12, 2021, JTG Entertainment announced its merger with Starweave Entertainment and the consequent disbandment of Berry Good; Johyun moved to Starweave to pursue her acting career. Later in November, she joined the cast of webseries Cherry Blossoms After Winter as the female lead. On January 30, 2022, she co-hosted the MBC special program leading to the Beijing Winter Olympics.

On January 11, 2023, she left JTG and signed with Ghost Studio, continuing her acting career under her birth name, Shin Jee-won.

Discography

Filmography

Film

TV series

TV shows

References

External links 

Living people
K-pop singers
K-pop musicians
South Korean women singers
South Korean female idols
South Korean female models
South Korean female dancers
Dongduk Women's University alumni
South Korean television personalities
South Korean television actresses
South Korean film actresses
1996 births